General elections were held in Aruba on 22 November 1985 to elect the Island Council. They were held shortly before Aruba was split from the Netherlands Antilles and obtained the status of a 'land' (country) within the Kingdom of the Netherlands. The Island Council was converted into the first Estates of Aruba on 1 January 1986.

Although the People's Electoral Movement  won the most seats, the Aruban People's Party formed a coalition government with the Aruban Patriotic Party, Aruban Democratic Party and National Democratic Alliance, with Henny Eman becoming the first Prime Minister of Aruba.

Results

References

1985 in Aruba
Aruba
Elections in Aruba
Election and referendum articles with incomplete results